Tuas Depot is an MRT depot serving the East West Line, located between Tuas West Road and Tuas West Drive in Singapore. It was constructed by Jurong Primewide Pte Ltd at a contract sum of S$237.1 million. Construction of the depot together with the four stations of the Tuas West Extension started in late 2011 and were fully operational on 18 June 2017. The depot is located after Tuas Link MRT station and it is able to house up to 60 trains. This is the second largest depot as the maintenance for the East West Line trains will be carried out here. With the opening of this depot, it has lightened the maintenance load in Bishan Depot that each of both line would have their own maintenance centre.

The depot is located off Tuas Link station on the East West Line and has two reception tracks: two tracks eastbound towards Tuas Link station.

Integration of bus terminal 
Tuas Bus Terminal was moved to a site on the roof of Tuas MRT Depot, adjacent to Tuas Link station, and opened on 7 October 2017.

The area designated for the proposed bus terminal is approximately 10,000 sq metres which is accessible via a ramp connecting directly to Tuas West Drive or another ramp structure connecting to Tuas Link 4.

The bus terminal has a naturally ventilated concourse area with facilities such as two passenger service offices, two separate Offices for main and secondary operators. The terminal is also staff friendly, with an administrative office, a staff lounge, designated staff toilets, a canteen and other rooms. Passenger elevators connect the ground level to the bus terminal. It is also accessible, having priority queues for the elderly and disabled, and has barrier free toilets.

For security reasons, the bus terminal, including its driveways and bus parking area is intended to be fully lockable and secured against illegal entry after operation hours and is intended to be maintained as a restricted and controlled area with no access by unauthorized personnel.

References

2017 establishments in Singapore
Mass Rapid Transit (Singapore) depots